Aunet is a village in the municipality of Tydal in Trøndelag county, Norway. The village is the location of Tydal Church which was built in 1696.

References

Villages in Trøndelag
Tydal